The 2015–16 Kent State Golden Flashes men's basketball team represented Kent State University during the 2015–16 NCAA Division I men's basketball season, their 100th season of play. The Golden Flashes, led by fifth year head coach Rob Senderoff, played their home games at the Memorial Athletic and Convocation Center, also known as the MAC Center, as members of the East Division of the Mid-American Conference. They finished the season 19–13, 10–8 in MAC play to finish in a tie for third place in the East Division. They lost in the first round of the MAC tournament to Bowling Green. Despite having 19 wins, they did not participate in a postseason tournament.

Previous season
The Golden Flashes finished the season 23–12, 12–6 in MAC play to finish in a share for the East Division championship as well as a share of the MAC overall regular season championship. They lost in the quarterfinals of the MAC tournament to Akron. They were invited to the CollegeInsider.com Tournament where they defeated Middle Tennessee in the first round and Texas A&M Corpus–Christi in the second round before losing in the quarterfinals to Northern Arizona.

Departures

Incoming Transfers

Recruiting class of 2015

Recruiting class of 2016

Roster

Schedule and results
Source: 

|-
!colspan=9 style="background:#F7BD0A; color:#131149;"| Non-Conference Games

|-
!colspan=9 style="background:#F7BD0A; color:#131149;"| Conference Games

|-
!colspan=9 style="background:#F7BD0A; color:#131149;"| MAC tournament

See also
List of Kent State Golden Flashes men's basketball seasons

References

Kent State
Kent State Golden Flashes men's basketball seasons
Kent State
Kent State